Winnett is a town in and the county seat of Petroleum County, Montana, United States. The population was 188 at the 2020 census.

History
Winnett was named for Walter John Winnett, who was born at the Queen's Hotel in Toronto, Ontario, Canada. Winnett ran away from home as a boy, seeking adventure in "Indian country." His excellent marksmanship abilities helped him get jobs with outfits who were always looking for someone who could keep them in fresh meat. When he was captured by Sioux Indians and later adopted into the tribe, he was given the name Eagle Eyes because of his remarkable shooting skills.

Winnett established a ranch in Montana Territory in 1879 near an active trading post and the Hangman's Tree used by vigilantes in the area. The massive ranch house, which he built in 1900 housed his own family and served as a gathering place for the community. Dances, weddings, funerals, church services, and school were all held here. Billings was the closest town, so Winnett built up a freight line business to haul supplies. Each of his outfits consisted of ten to twenty horses and huge wagons. In 1910 he built a store and petitioned for a post office.

In addition to county government offices, Winnett's businesses and services include a general store, two filling/service stations, a post office, a school system with grades K-12, a new event venue completed in 2023,  a motel, 2 RV parks, a campground  and a bar-and-grill. The nearest medical facilities are in Lewistown.

Geography
Winnett is located at  (47.004381, -108.351052).

Climate
According to the Köppen Climate Classification system, Winnett has a semi-arid climate, abbreviated "BSk" on climate maps.

Demographics

2010 census
As of the census of 2010, there were 182 people, 91 households, and 50 families residing in the town. The racial makeup of the town was 100.0% White. Hispanic or Latino of any race were 1.1% of the population.

There were 91 households, of which 22.0% had children under the age of 18 living with them, 47.3% were married couples living together, 6.6% had a female householder with no husband present, 1.1% had a male householder with no wife present, and 45.1% were non-families. 42.9% of all households were made up of individuals, and 19.8% had someone living alone who was 65 years of age or older. The average household size was 2.00 and the average family size was 2.74.

The median age in the town was 50 years. 18.7% of residents were under the age of 18; 3.7% were between the ages of 18 and 24; 19.1% were from 25 to 44; 33.9% were from 45 to 64; and 24.2% were 65 years of age or older. The gender makeup of the town was 53.8% male and 46.2% female.

2000 census
As of the census of 2000, there were 185 people, 87 households, and 52 families residing in the town. The population density was 190.4 people per square mile (73.6/km2). There were 124 housing units at an average density of 127.6 per square mile (49.4/km2). The racial makeup of the town was 99.46% White, and 0.54% from two or more races.

There were 87 households, out of which 28.7% had children under the age of 18 living with them, 47.1% were married couples living together, 10.3% had a female householder with no husband present, and 40.2% were non-families. 36.8% of all households were made up of individuals, and 18.4% had someone living alone who was 65 years of age or older. The average household size was 2.13 and the average family size was 2.83.

In the town, the population was spread out, with 23.8% under the age of 18, 5.4% from 18 to 24, 23.8% from 25 to 44, 28.1% from 45 to 64, and 18.9% who were 65 years of age or older. The median age was 43 years. For every 100 females there were 101.1 males. For every 100 females age 18 and over, there were 95.8 males.

The median income for a household in the town was $17,361, and the median income for a family was $26,875. Males had a median income of $21,667 versus $16,250 for females. The per capita income for the town was $10,892. About 23.1% of families and 22.8% of the population were below the poverty line, including 41.5% of those under the age of eighteen and 6.8% of those 65 or over.

Education
Covering the town of Winnett and the surrounding area, Winnett Independent School District has students from grades K-12. They are known as the Rams. In 2006, Winnett Schools won the nations prestigious Blue Ribbon School award, awarded to only 200 schools nationwide.  

Petroleum County Community Library serves the area. The local public library offers a once a week pre-school program.

References

County seats in Montana
Towns in Petroleum County, Montana
1910 establishments in Montana
Populated places established in 1910